Paandavar Bhoomi is a 2001 Indian Tamil-language family drama film, written and directed by Cheran. The film has Arun Vijay (credited as Arun Kumar) Shamitha and Rajkiran playing the lead roles. While Vinu Chakravarthy and Mukesh Tiwari played the antagonists, Chandrasekhar, Ranjith, Manorama and Charle played supporting roles. The film released on 21 September 2001. It met with critical acclaim and went on to win the Filmfare Award for Best Director – Tamil for Cheran.

Plot 

Dhanasekar returns to his native village along with his family after twelve years of city life. All the villagers feel happy over welcoming him back to the village. Dhanasekar decides to build a new bungalow adjacent to his ancestral home in the village and plans to live there. He approaches Tamizharasan aka Tamizh, an architect to design his new home. Tamizh's father is also an architect who is famous for traditional architectural designs.

Dhanasekar and his family temporarily stay in his neighbor's house until the construction of new house is completed. Tamizh also stays in a tent near the construction site managing the construction activities. Vinu Chakravarthy lives in the same village and he hates Dhanasekar and his family. He wants them to be killed and sends his son Mukesh Tiwari to work with the construction workers so that he can get them killed someday.

Jeeva is Dhanasekar's niece and she befriends Tamizh. Tamizh also likes Jeeva and slowly friendship transforms into love for Tamizh. When Tamizh proposes his love to Jeeva, she leaves the place without replying which makes Tamizh understand that she does not have any feelings for him.

One day, a family comes to Dhanasekar's house expressing interest to get Jeeva married to their son. But Dhanasekar informs them that Jeeva will be married to his brother Ranjith who is in jail for 12 years. Tamizh gets shocked knowing about this and he is angered because the family plans to sacrifice Jeeva by having her marry someone who has been jailed for years. Dhanasekar learns of the love between Jeeva and Tamizh. He calls Tamizh and tells about his family's past.

In 1990,
Dhanasekar was a rich farmer in the same village along with his brothers and Ranjith, sisters Kavitha and Thamarai (also Shamitha), and mother. Vinu Chakravarthy, a distant relative of Dhanasekar is also a farmer in the same village, but does not like Dhanasekar's family and always picks up quarrels with them. One day, Vinu and his sons sport a tractor (rare for that time) and a new Royal enfield in front of the villagers, who get to know that they have leased off a portion of land to a Tanning factory. Despite the village council's warning to cancel the lease as it would pollute entire water source, Vinu and his sons refuse. The village's farmers, led by Dhanasekar and his brothers waylay the tanning factory officials and explain their issue, following which the project is shifted to another place. Vinu and his sons refuse to return the advance payments, and their new vehicles are eventually ceased off by the factory management.

The next night, Vinu Chakravarthy poisons the farm pond of Dhanasekar, thereby killing all of Dhanasekar's cows and oxen that drank water from the pond. Dhanasekar gets furious and lodges a complaint with the police following which Vinu Chakravarthy is incarcerated. Things cool off a bit, but then to everyone's shock, the family learns that Thamarai is in love with Akash, Vinu Chakravarthy's younger son. Dhanasekar and Manorama warn Thamarai to forget Akash and they plan to get her married immediately with someone else. But on the day of marriage, Thamarai elopes from home with Akash and Manorama dies the same night, as she could not tolerate this.

While Dhanasekar and his brothers perform their mother's funeral and take her body to the graveyard in a procession, Thamarai comes along with Akash following their wedding. Ranjith gets furious seeing her and he runs towards them with a sickle, and decapitates Thamarai and Akash in anger. All happened in a fraction of second and Ranjith could not believe that he killed his own sister. He then feels guilty and surrenders to the police and is sentenced to 14 years of imprisonment.

Out of sorrow and shame, Dhanasekar and his family members covertly leave the village and move to Tirupur where they earn well and the family comes back to the same village after 11 years. But they are worried that Ranjith's life will be spoiled as no girl will marry him as he has been jailed. So they decide to get Jeeva married to him, as it is socially permissible for a man to marry his elder sister's daughter. Jeeva though not interested in the proposal, agrees to marry her maternal uncle Ranjith for the well-being of her family. Since Ranjith will be released 2 years earlier due to good behavior, the family is building the new house for the to be couple.

Tamizh understands the family's situation and decides to give up his love for Jeeva. But on the other hand, Jeeva decides to express her interest in marrying Tamizh. She meets Tamizh and conveys her love. But Tamizh says that he learned of her family's past and he also felt proud about Jeeva's decision to sacrifice her life for the happiness of her family. He apologizes to Jeeva for confusing her predetermined mind in the name of love and he also requests her to marry Ranjith who is about to get released from jail soon.

The new home is completed and Mukesh Tiwari plants a bomb in the home to destroy it and to kill everyone inside. Tamizh discovers Mukesh Tiwari's plans and alerts everyone. Also, Tamizh rushes into the house in search of the bomb and finds it after much struggle. He takes the bomb and throws it away before it could explode thereby saving all the family members and also the newly built home. The entire family thanks Tamizh for his help. Tamizh leaves to his home on the next day.

After a few days, Dhanasekar comes along with his brothers Chandrasekhar and Ranjith, after being released from jail to meet Tamizh and his father Vijayakumar inviting them for the house-warming ceremony as well as for Jeeva's wedding. On seeing the invitation card, Tamizh is surprised to see his name as the groom for Jeeva.

A flashback is shown where Ranjith, after being released from jail, comes to meet his family. They share some good moments as he meets his family members after twelve years as he never allowed anyone to meet him in jail except Dhanasekar. Ranjith is surprised on seeing Jeeva as she exactly resembles his sister Thamarai in looks. Ranjith also believes that Thamarai has reborn in the form of Jeeva and feels happy that he got back his lovable sister whom he killed out of anger. So he wants to ensure that Jeeva is happily married and her husband is chosen with her consent. Also, Ranjith says that he does not want to marry any one and instead he prefers to stay single along with all the family members. Realising the love of Jeeva and Thamizh, the family members then decide to have them marry. The movie ends with Tamizh and Jeeva uniting.

Cast

Soundtrack 

The soundtrack album was composed by Bharadwaj.

Track list

Critical reception 
The film received critical acclaim from critics. Malathi Rangarajan from The Hindu praised as "Inundated with talent from every quarter" and said: "has to be welcomed, with open arms because decent, meaningful cinema deserves encouragement". Rediff.com particularly heaped praises at Cheran for his screenplay and said "With directors of the calibre of Cheran in its rank, Tamil cinema would not be discredited or degenerated".
Thiraipadam.com lauded Cheran saying "Cheran is one of the few filmmakers who has not succumbed to the commercial bug and continues to make movies that satisfy his own creative spirit and also convey a valid message to society."

The film also received mixed reviews. Sify.com criticised the length of the movie and said: "Cheran has churned out yet another village based sob story to torment you further" and concluded that "it is a typical overdose of Cheran melodrama masala".

References

External links 
 

Films directed by Cheran
2001 films
2000s Tamil-language films
Indian drama films
Films scored by Bharadwaj (composer)